Merregnon Studios is a company based in Dresden, Germany, founded by Thomas Böcker. It produces recordings and concerts worldwide, including the orchestral Merregnon and Game Concerts series.

History
Merregnon Studios was founded in 1999 by Thomas Böcker. Having spent time in Japan and as a lifelong fan of video game music, Böcker sought to bring orchestral video game music concerts to Europe and produce storytelling arrangements and scores. The earliest example of his vision came with the first volume in the Merregnon CD series in 2000. His role as executive producer and project director provided him with contacts to conductors, orchestras and composers from around the world, and he began to develop the concept of a series of video game music orchestra concerts. Inspired by game concerts from Japan, the Orchestral Game Music Concerts from the 1990s in particular, he produced the first concert event of its kind outside Japan in 2003, the Symphonic Game Music Concert during the Games Convention in Leipzig, the first trade fair for video games in Europe. The success of the event led to his ongoing international series Game Concerts.

Besides concert productions, Merregnon Studios has produced and directed numerous orchestral video game music recordings and albums including Masashi's Hamauzu's debut album Vielen Dank, SEGA's World Club Champion Football and Square Enix's drammatica -The Very Best of Yoko Shimomura.

Game Concerts in Leipzig (2003 - 2007)

On August 20, 2003 Thomas Böcker produced his first Game Concert as a part of the official opening ceremony of the Leipzig Games Convention, performed by the Czech National Symphony Orchestra at the Gewandhaus Leipzig, promoted by the Leipzig Trade Fair. Following the success of the event, further four annual concerts with various programmes took place under his direction until 2007, performed by the FILMharmonic Orchestra Prague.

Game Concerts in Cologne (2008 - 2012) 
Symphonic Shades – Hülsbeck in Concert (2008) in honour of German composer Chris Hülsbeck was the first of five annual concerts by the WDR Funkhausorchester featuring music from video games, followed by Symphonic Fantasies – Music from Square Enix (2009 and 2012), dedicated to music by the Japanese game developer Square Enix.

Symphonic Legends – Music from Nintendo (2010) focused on video game music by the Japanese game developer Nintendo, while Symphonic Odysseys — Tribute to Nobuo Uematsu (2011) was a tribute to the Japanese composer Nobuo Uematsu.

Game Concerts worldwide (from 2013)
Final Symphony (2013) is a concert production featuring music from Final Fantasy VI, VII and X. The world premiere was performed by the Sinfonieorchester Wuppertal. Shortly after, the programme embarked on a world tour including the first performance of game music by the London Symphony Orchestra. The debut concert of Final Symphony II (2015) with music from Final Fantasy V, VIII, IX and XIII was presented by the Beethoven Orchester Bonn.

Symphonic Memories – Music from Square Enix (2018) including video game music by Square Enix was first presented by the Royal Stockholm Philharmonic Orchestra. In 2021, for the tenth anniversary of Bethesda Softworks''' action role-playing game Skyrim, Böcker produced a concert film featuring the London Symphony Orchestra and London Voices.

Merregnon: Land of Silence (from 2021)Merregnon: Land of Silence (2021) is a symphonic fairy tale with music composed by Yoko Shimomura. It was produced by Thomas Böcker to introduce young people and families to orchestral music in the tradition of Sergei Prokofiev's Peter and the Wolf, with modern means adopting a game and anime aesthetic. The work was premiered and filmed by the Royal Stockholm Philharmonic Orchestra.

Discography

Awards

 2010 Best Concert: Symphonic Legends - music from Nintendo, Swedish LEVEL magazine
 2010 Best Arranged Album - Solo / Ensemble: Symphonic Fantasies - music from Square Enix, Annual Game Music Awards 2010
 2011 Best Live Concert: Symphonic Legends – music from Nintendo, Annual Original Sound Version Awards 2010
 2011 Best Live Concert: Symphonic Odysseys – Tribute to Nobuo Uematsu, Annual Original Sound Version Awards 2011
 2011 Outstanding Production – Concert: Symphonic Odysseys – Tribute to Nobuo Uematsu, Annual Game Music Awards 2011
 2012 Outstanding Production - Concert: Symphonic Fantasies Tokyo - music from Square Enix, Annual Game Music Awards 2012
 2013 Outstanding Production - Concert: Final Symphony London - music from Final Fantasy, Annual Game Music Awards 2013
 2015 First person to produce a video game concert outside Japan: Thomas Böcker, Guinness World Records
 2015 Outstanding Entrepreneurship - Cultural and Creative Pilots Award: Thomas Böcker, German Federal Government
 2015 Best Album - Arranged Album: Final Symphony - music from Final Fantasy, Annual Game Music Awards 2015
 2020 Best Album - Official Arranged Album: Symphonic Memories Concert – music from Square Enix'', Annual Game Music Awards 2020

References

External links 

 

Recording studios in Germany